The name Wipha or Vipa (incorrect spelling) has been used to name four tropical cyclones in the western North Pacific Ocean. It was contributed by Thailand and is a female given name that literally means 'splendor' or 'Lustre.'

 Typhoon Vipa (2001) (T0117, 21W) – remained at sea.
 Typhoon Wipha (2007) (T0712, 13W, Goring) – Category 4 super typhoon that struck China.
 Typhoon Wipha (2013) (T1326, 25W, Tino) – Category 4 typhoon that affected Japan.
 Tropical Storm Wipha (2019) (T1907, 08W) – caused significant damages in Vietnam and China.

Pacific typhoon set index articles